The 1985 Cincinnati Bearcats football team represented the University of Cincinnati during the 1985 NCAA Division I-A football season. The Bearcats, led by head coach Dave Currey, participated as independent and played their home games at Riverfront Stadium.  On-Campus Nippert Stadium was used as a supplement.

Schedule

Game Films
1985 Cincinnati - Virginia Tech Football Hi-Lites
1985 Cincinnati - Louisville Football Hi-Lites
1985 Cincinnati - Boston College Football Hi-Lites
1985 Cincinnati - Penn State Football Hi-Lites

References

Cincinnati
Cincinnati Bearcats football seasons
Cincinnati Bearcats football